Ali Madhali (born May 26, 1991), is a Saudi Arabian professional footballer who plays for Al-Dahab as a forward.

References

1991 births
Living people
Ittihad FC players
Al-Wehda Club (Mecca) players
Al-Orobah FC players
Al-Shoulla FC players
Al Safa FC players
Damac FC players
Al-Kholood Club players
Jeddah Club players
Wej SC players
Al-Nojoom FC players
Al-Sahel SC (Saudi Arabia) players
Al-Diriyah Club players
Al-Dahab Club players
Saudi Arabian footballers
Saudi First Division League players
Saudi Professional League players
Saudi Second Division players
Saudi Third Division players
Association football forwards